Korean War Memorial Wall may refer to:
Korean War Memorial Wall (Canada), the Memorial Wall in Brampton, Ontario, Canada
Korean War Memorial Wall (U.S.), the Memorial Wall in the Korean War Veterans Memorial, Washington, D.C., United States